Halligen Frisian is the dialect of the North Frisian language spoken on the Halligen islands, primarily Langeneß and Hooge, in the German region of North Frisia. The dialect has survived despite the islands' being home to less than 300 people and unprotected by dikes, mandating evacuations during storms. However, it is now in danger of extinction. Although it is spoken on islands, it is considered part of the Mainland North Frisian dialects as opposed to the Insular North Frisian Dialects, due to its linguistic features.

Grammar

Verbs
Below are six commonly used verbs in Halligen Frisian:

 The future tense is formed with the verbs wal or skal.
 The perfect tense is formed with either hääw or weese.

References

Further reading
 Jens Lorenzen  Deutsch-Halligfriesisch: Ein Wörterbuch / Tutsk-Freesk: En Üürdeböök: 6000 Vokabeln Halligfriesisch mit Texten aus dem 17. bis 20. Jahrhundert,  Bräist/Bredstedt: Nordfriisk Instituut, 1977 (in German and Halligen Frisian) .
 Ommo Wilts (ed.) Friesische Formenlehre in Tabellen VII: Halligen, Husum: Matthiesen Verlag, 1997 .

North Frisian language
Halligen